Idalus albidior is a moth of the family Erebidae. It was described by Walter Rothschild in 1917. It is found in Venezuela.

References

albidior
Moths described in 1917